Shamama Mahmudali gizi Hasanova (Arayatlı, 7 November 1923 – Baku, 5 September 2008) was an Azerbaijani cotton grower and politician.

Work 
Since 1942, Hasanova worked gathering cotton at a collective farm in the Fuzuli District of the Azerbaijan SSR, where she led a Komsomol team. In 1947, she was awarded the Hero of Socialist Labour title for high crop yields, becoming the first cotton grower in the Soviet Union to receive this distinction. She was awarded the title again in 1950.

In 1953 she became the chair of the 1st of May collective farm.

In 1966 she graduated from the Azerbaijan State Agricultural University.

Politics 
Hasanova was a delegate to the 20th and 23rd Congress of the Communist Party of the Soviet Union. She also served as a deputy of the Supreme Soviet of the Soviet Union from the 4th to the 11th convocations. She served as vice-chair of the Soviet of the Union between 1960 and 1974. She was a member of the Central Committee of the Communist Party of Azerbaijan since 1955.

Awards 
 Medal of the All-Union Agricultural Exhibition
 Hero of Socialist Labour (2 awards: 1947 and 1950)
 Order of Lenin (4 awards; 1947, 1948, 1949, 1976)
 Medal "For Labour Valour" (1970)
 Order of the Red Banner of Labour (2 awards: 1966, 1986)
 Order of the October Revolution (2 awards: 1971, 1973)

See also 
 List of twice Heroes of Socialist Labour
 Basti Bagirova

References

External links 
 Shamama Hasanova entry at the Great Soviet Encyclopedia, 3rd Edition (1970-1979)
 

1923 births
2008 deaths
People from Fuzuli District
Azerbaijan Communist Party (1920) politicians
Heroes of Socialist Labour
Recipients of the Order of Lenin
Recipients of the Order of the Red Banner of Labour
Women farmers
Soviet women in politics
20th-century Azerbaijani women politicians
20th-century Azerbaijani politicians
Azerbaijan State Agricultural University alumni
Fourth convocation members of the Soviet of the Union
Fifth convocation members of the Soviet of the Union
Sixth convocation members of the Soviet of the Union
Seventh convocation members of the Soviet of the Union
Eighth convocation members of the Soviet of the Union
Ninth convocation members of the Soviet of the Union
Tenth convocation members of the Soviet of the Union
Eleventh convocation members of the Soviet of the Union
Members of the Congress of People's Deputies of the Soviet Union